The following are notable people who were either born, raised or have lived for a significant period of time in Gjakova.

List 

Amir Abrashi, Albanian footballer
Abdullah (Dah) Polloshka, Fighter against the Ottoman occupiers, National hero
Fehmi Agani, Albanian sociologist, academic and politician
Mahmut Bakalli, Albanian politician, 5th President of the League of Communists of Kosovo
Lorik Cana, Albanian footballer and captain on National football team of Albania
Besim Dina, Albanian television host
Masar Caka, Albanian painter
Gent Cakaj, Albanian minister for Europe and Foreign Affairs 
Bardhyl Çaushi, Kosovo Albanian dean of law of the University of Pristina
Bajram Curri, Albanian, founding member of the Committee for the National Defence of Kosovo
Božidar Delić (born 1956), retired Yugoslav general and Serbian politician
Teki Dervishi, Albanian playwright
Rauf Dhomi, Albanian composer
Mladen Dodić, Serbian football coach
Abdullah Pashë Dreni, Albanian pasha 
Emin Duraku, Albanian, partisan
Bekim Fehmiu, Yugoslav-Albanian actor, the first Eastern European to star in Hollywood during the Cold War
Gëzim Lala, Kosovar Albanian football player who played for FK Galenika Zemun.
Ardian Gashi, Albanian-Norwegian footballer
Nora Gjakova, Olympic judo champion
Riza bej Gjakova, Albanian nationalist and guerrilla fighter
Eros Grezda, Albanian footballer 
Besnik Hasi, Albanian footballer and coach
Fadil Hoxha, Albanian, first Prime Minister of AP Kosovo
Atifete Jahjaga, Albanian, former President of Kosovo
Benet Kaci, Albanian media personality
Valonis Kadrijaj, Albanian-German footballer
Gjon Nikolle Kazazi was an Albanian Catholic bishop of Skopje, known for discovering Meshari of Gjon Buzuku.
Ardian Kozniku, former Albanian-Croatian footballer
Ahmet Koronica, Albanian nationalist
Flaka Krelani, Albanian singer
Naim Kryeziu, Albanian footballer, part of AS Roma's first Serie A win
Burim Kukeli, Albanian footballer
Festina Mejzini, Albanian singer
Mimoza Kusari Lila, Kosovo Albanian politician
Din Mehmeti, Albanian poet
Albesian Mataj, one the youngest soldiers of the Kosovo Liberation Army who died on active duty
Avni Mula, Albanian musician
Blerim Mula, Albanian footballer and manager
Muslim Mulliqi, Albanian impressionist and expressionist painter 
Fadil Nimani, KLA fighter
Dimitar Obshti, Bulgarian revolutionary
Fanol Perdedaj, Albanian-German footballer
Ali Podrimja, Albanian poet 
Mirlinda Kusari Purrini, Kosovo Albanian economist
Aleksandar Tijanić, Serbian journalist and former RTS director
Esat Valla, Albanian painter
Miodrag Vlahović, Montenegrin former foreign minister
Liza Vorfi, Albanian actress
Vladimir Durković, Serbian football player and Olympic champion
Momir Vojvodić, Montenegrin Serb poet and politician
Sylejman Vokshi, Albanian military commander and leader of the League of Prizren
Tahir Zajmi, Albanian leader of the Second League of Prizren, author of the work "The Second Connection of Prizren and the Heroic Struggle of the People for the Defense of Kosovo", Brussels, 1964
Hajdar Dushi, Albanian member of the Communist Group of Shkodra , among the first anti-fascist resistance activists in Albania
Bekim Fehmiu, Famous Albanian actor, born in Sarajevo, family origin from Gjakova (son of Hoxha Ibrahim Fehmi)
Ismet Peja, Albanian folk singer
Shkelzen (Xeni) Jetishi, Albanian folk singer
Shkelzen Doli, Albanian violinist in Vienna Philharmonic
Elton Zherka, KLA fighter, National Hero
Ilir Soba, KLA fighter, National Hero
Yll Morina, KLA fighter, National Hero
Permet Vula, KLA fighter, National Hero
Vjosa Dobruna, Albanian human rights activist, a founder of the Center for the Protection of Women and Children, the Safe House for Women in Gjakova, and the Women’s Center in Tetovo, award winner of the Edward Barsky Award for Courageous Physician in Chicago, ILL, USA, and many other awards
Ganimete Vula-Nura, first Albanian women parachutist in Kosova
Behije Dashi, first Albanian women architect in Kosova
Qamile Jaka, first Albanian women dentist in Kosova  

Gjakova